50 Feet from Syria is a 2015 short-documentary film about a Syrian-American orthopedic surgeon Hisham Bismar who travels to the Turkey-Syrian border situated Al-Amal Hospital during the Syrian civil war. Directed by Skye Fitzgerald, 50 Feet from Syria was shortlisted with ten other documentaries from 74 entries submitted to the 88th Academy Awards in the Documentary Short Subject category. The final five nominations were scheduled to be announced on January 14, 2016.

Premise
50 feet from Syria follows Syrian-American surgeon Hisham Bismar as he travels to the Turkish/Syrian border to volunteer for operating on victims from the Syrian Civil War.

References

External links
 
 
 

2015 films
American short documentary films
Documentary films about the Syrian civil war
Films shot in Turkey
2015 short documentary films
Documentary films about health care
Works about the Syrian civil war
2010s English-language films
2010s American films